Gernot Wieland is an emeritus professor at the University of British Columbia, who specializes in the Anglo-Saxon period, specifically glosses in Anglo-Saxon manuscripts, relations between Anglo-Saxon scholars and their continental counterparts, and the Latin literature written by Anglo-Saxons.

Wieland's 1983 The Latin Glosses on Arator and Prudentius established a typology of glosses. In 2017 Brepols published a Festschrift in his honor, Teaching and Learning in Medieval Europe.

References

External links
Wieland's page at UBC

Living people
Canadian medievalists
German medievalists
Academic staff of the University of British Columbia
Anglo-Saxon studies scholars
Year of birth missing (living people)